The Chevrolet Light Six Series L was an American car produced by Chevrolet in 1914 and 1915. The famous Chevrolet 'Bow Tie' emblem made its grand debut in 1914, and has been used on all Chevrolet cars and trucks since then. 
When the Classic Six ceased production at the end of the 1914 model year the Light Six replaced it in 1915 as Chevrolet's top-of-the-line car.

Features

The L Series used a Sterling six-cylinder L-head engine rated at 35 bhp and was offered with an Auto-lite electric starter. A cone style clutch was mounted to the engine with a drive shaft that was connected to a rear end mounted selective sliding 3 speed transmission. The car used a 3/4 floating type rear suspension with 34 x 4 inch tires.

Unlike the lower priced H Series which was available in two body styles (Royal Mail Roadster $750) and the (Baby Grand Touring $875) the L Series was only available as a 5-passenger four-door Touring car and cost US$1,475 ($ in  dollars ). It was competitive with the Buick Six in both size and price.

Available body colors were Chevrolet (bow tie) Blue or Gunmetal Grey. The hood, radiator and fenders were all painted black. The Chassis and wheels were bow tie blue. Also included was Light grey pin striping on the wheel spokes and hood vents.

Production Notes
Series L production ran from 1914 through 1915. Chevrolet Motor Company records indicate a grand total of approx. 1000 were made for both years.

Surviving Example
The one and only known surviving Light Six (shown here) is a 1914 model owned by a long time member of the VCCA (Vintage Chevrolet Club of America) in which he is known as "Mr. Chevrolet". He spent many years looking for one these cars and found this one in Massachusetts in 1984, then painstakingly restored it back to its former glory.

References 

Light Six
Brass Era vehicles
Cars introduced in 1914